One Splendid Hour is a 1929 American silent drama film directed by Cliff Wheeler and starring Viola Dana, George Periolat and Jack Richardson. Dana retired following the film, due to the introduction of sound films.

Synopsis
A socialite goes slumming a poor neighbourhood where she meets a Doctor. In order to attract his attention she disguises herself as a wayward girl.

Cast
 Viola Dana as Bobbie Walsh 
 George Periolat as Senator Walsh 
 Allan Simpson as Dr. Thornton 
 Lewis Sargent as Jimmy O'Shea 
 Jack Richardson as Peter Hoag 
 Lucy Beaumont as Mother Kelly 
 Florice Cooper as Rose Kelly 
 Ernie Adams as Solly 
 Hugh Saxon as The Roué 
 Charles H. Hickman as Police Captain

References

Bibliography
 Lowe, Denise. An Encyclopedic Dictionary of Women in Early American Films: 1895-1930. Routledge, 2014.

External links

1929 films
1929 drama films
Silent American drama films
Films directed by Cliff Wheeler
American silent feature films
1920s English-language films
American black-and-white films
1920s American films